Dominic Duval (c. 1944 – July 22, 2016) was an American free jazz bassist.

Since the 1990s, Duval was active principally on the New York City jazz scene. He did not begin recording regularly until the 1990s, but since then had appeared on a very large number of albums, particularly on the labels CIMP, Cadence Jazz, and Leo Records. As a result, Duval was described by Allmusic as "unquestionably...one of the most-recorded free jazz bassists on the planet". Todd Jenkins describes Duval and drummer Jay Rosen as the "house rhythm section" for CIMP, given the number of recordings on which they have jointly appeared. Duval's freedom of expression was paramount in his playing. Duval played his Hutchings bass more often like a violin, guitar or lead saxophone. He displayed fast lines and rich textures. Seldom did he play the bass in a traditional role low pitch rhythmic role. Instead he freely interacted with other members within the ensemble.

Duval died on July 22, 2016.

Discography

As leader or co-leader 
The Wedding Band (CIMP, 1997)
State of the Art (CIMP, 1997)
Nightbird Inventions (Cadence, 1997)
Live in Concert (Cadence, 1998)
The Navigator (Leo, 1998)
Equinox (Leo, 1999)
Working with the Elements (CIMP, 1999) with Glenn Spearman
Under the Pyramid (Leo, 2000)
The Experiment (Blue Jackel, 2000)
Undersound (Leo, 2000)
Asylum (Leo, 2001)
Cries and Whispers (Cadence, 1999 [2001])
American Scrapbook (CIMP, 2002)
Undersound II (Leo, 2003)
No Respect (Acoustics, 2003)
Rules of Engagement Vol. I (Drimala, 2003)
Coming From Us (Quixotic, 2004)
Rules of Engagement Vol. II (Drimala, 2004)
Monkinus (CIMP, 2006)
Mountain Air (CIMP, 2006)
Nowhere to Hide (NotTwo, 2008)
The Spirit of Things (CIMP, 2008)
For the Children (Cadence, 2008)
The Last Dance Volumes 1 and 2 (Cadence, 2009) - with Cecil Taylor
Monk Dreams (NoBusiness, 2009)
Magic (NotTwo, 2010)
Park West Suite (Cadence, 2011)

As sideman
With Marshall Allen
Mark–n–Marshall: Monday (CIMP, 1998)
Mark–n–Marshall: Tuesday (CIMP, 1998)

With Paul Lytton
The Balance of Trade (CIMP, 1996)

With Joe McPhee
The Watermelon Suite (CIMP, 1998 [1999]) as Trio X
 The Dream Book (Cadence, 1998 [1999])
Rapture (Cadence, 1999) as Trio X
 In the Spirit (CIMP, 1999)
 No Greater Love (CIMP, 1999 [2000])
 Port of Saints (CjR, 2000 [2006])
 Angels, Devils & Haints (CjR, 2000 [2009])
On Tour (Cadence Jazz, 2001) as Trio X
In Black and White (Cadence, 2002) as Trio X
Journey (CIMP, 2003) as Trio X
The Sugar Hill Suite (CIMP, 2004) as Trio X
 In Finland (Cadence Jazz, 2004 [2005]) with Matthew Shipp
Moods: Playing with the Elements (CIMP, 2005) as Trio X
Roulette at Location One (Cadence Jazz, 2005) as Trio X
Air: Above and Beyond (CIMPol, 2006) as Trio X
2006 U.S. Tour (CIMPol, 2007) as Trio X
Live in Vilnius (NoBusiness, 2008) as Trio X
Live On Tour 2008 (CIMPol, 2010) as Trio X
 Live On Tour 2010 (CIMPol, 2012) as Trio X

With the Glenn Spearman–John Heward Group
 Th (CIMP, 1997)

With Steve Swell
Moons of Jupiter (CIMP, 1997)

References

American jazz double-bassists
Male double-bassists
1945 births
2016 deaths
American male jazz musicians
NoBusiness Records artists
Leo Records artists
Cadence Jazz Records artists
CIMP artists